Armstrong County is a county located in the U.S. state of Texas.  It is in the Texas Panhandle and its county seat is Claude. 

As of the 2020 census, its population was 1,848. Armstrong County is included in the Amarillo metropolitan area.

The county was formed in 1876 and later organized in 1890. It was named for one of several Texas pioneer families named Armstrong.

History

Native Americans

Paleo-Indians first inhabitants as far back as 10,000 BC. Apachean cultures roamed the county until Comanche dominated around 1700. The Comanches were defeated by the United States Army in the Red River War of 1874. Later tribes include Kiowa and Cheyenne.

County established and growth
In 1876, the Texas Legislature established Armstrong County from portions of Bexar County, and it organized in 1890 with Claude as the county seat. 

In 1876, Charles Goodnight brought a herd of 1,600 cattle into the Palo Duro Canyon, and he and John George Adair established ranching in the county. The JA Ranch encompassed over a million acres (4,000 km2), spread over Armstrong County and five adjoining counties. The county land use was primarily ranch-related, even after the trickling in of homesteaders, for the remainder of the 19th century.

In 1887, the JA Ranch split up, giving way to a terminus for the Fort Worth and Denver City Railway.  The first town from the ranch was Goodnight. Landowner Robert E. Montgomery platted the town of Washburn, named after railroad executive D.W. Washburn.

The next year, railroad lines turned Washburn into a boom town. In the same year, Armstrong City was renamed Claude in honor of railroad engineer Claude Ayers. In 1890, the two towns competed for the county seat, with Claude winning.

At the beginning of the 20th century, ranching began to share the land with cotton and wheat crops, although ranching remained the leading industry. The Great Depression had a severe effect on the county's economy, and recovery took years.  Ranches still occupied about 68% of the land in the county in 2005.

Many scenes of the 1963 Paul Newman film Hud were filmed at Goodnight and Claude.

Geography

Major highways
  U.S. Highway 287
  State Highway 207

Adjacent counties
 Carson County (north)
 Gray County (northeast)
 Donley County (east)
 Briscoe County (south)
 Swisher County (southwest)
 Randall County (west)
 Potter County (northwest)

Demographics

As of the census of 2000, 2,148 people, 802 households, and 612 families resided in the county.  The population density was 2 people per square mile (1/km2).  The 920 housing units averaged 1 per square mile (0/km2).  The racial makeup of the county was 95.44% White, 0.28% Black or African American, 0.65% Native American, 2.79% from other races, and 0.84% from two or more races.  About 5.40% of the population was Hispanic or Latino of any race.

Of the 802 households, 33.90% had children under the age of 18 living with them, 67.20% were married couples living together, 6.10% had a female householder with no husband present, and 23.60% were non-families. About 21.40% of all households were made up of individuals, and 12.00% had someone living alone who was 65 years of age or older.  The average household size was 2.58 and the average family size was 2.99.

In the county, the population was distributed as  26.00% under the age of 18, 6.10% from 18 to 24, 24.80% from 25 to 44, 23.80% from 45 to 64, and 19.20% who were 65 years of age or older.  The median age was 41 years. For every 100 females, there were 93.20 males.  For every 100 females age 18 and over, there were 90.30 males.

The median income for a household in the county was $38,194, and for a family was $43,894. Males had a median income of $30,114 versus $21,786 for females. The per capita income for the county was $17,151.  About 7.90% of families and 10.60% of the population were below the poverty line, including 15.80% of those under age 18 and 11.60% of those age 65 or over.

Education
The Claude Independent School District serves almost all of Armstrong County.

Three school districts headquartered in surrounding counties, Clarendon Consolidated Independent School District, Groom Independent School District, and Happy Independent School District, include small unincorporated portions of Armstrong County.

Communities

City
 Claude (county seat)

Unincorporated communities
 Fairview
 Goodnight
 Malden
 Paloduro
 Washburn
 Wayside

Government

Law enforcement
The current sheriff of Armstrong County is Melissa Anderson.  She is assisted by three deputies.  In addition to law enforcement duties, the Armstrong Sheriff's Office operates a county jail that houses up to eight inmates.  The jail is staffed by five jailers (four full-time and one part-time) that are dual-hatted as dispatchers.

This jail, located in Claude, Texas was erected in 1953 with the designs of Lawrence A. Kerr and Clayton B. Shiver.  It was built with stone quarried 14 miles to the south of Claude in Palo Duro Canyon that was recycled from the demolition of the former jail built in 1893.  The jail houses inmates on the second floor and the first floor formerly served as the home of the Sheriff, though it has been converted to office space.  The jail is also the location of the county's public-safety answering point (PSAP) and dispatch center.

Politics

See also 

 Armstrong County Sheriff's Office
 List of museums in the Texas Panhandle
 National Register of Historic Places listings in Armstrong County, Texas
 Recorded Texas Historic Landmarks in Armstrong County

References

External links
 Armstrong County
 
 Armstrong County from the Texas Almanac
 Armstrong County from the TXGenWeb Project
 Armstrong County Profile from the Texas Association of Counties
 Interactive Texas Map
 Texas Map Collection 

 
1890 establishments in Texas
Populated places established in 1890
Texas Panhandle